The 2019–20 season is Newell's Old Boys' 58th consecutive season in the top division of Argentine football. In addition to the Primera División, the club are competing in the Copa Argentina and Copa de la Superliga.

The season generally covers the period from 1 July 2019 to 30 June 2020.

Review

Pre-season
Víctor Figueroa was the first out, with the midfielder agreeing, on 31 May 2019, to join Ecuadorian Serie A side Aucas in the succeeding June. 11 June saw Iván Silva extend his loan with Brown. Brian Sarmiento agreed terms with Volos on 20 June. Santiago Gentiletti became their first reinforcement for the new campaign, arriving from Spanish Segunda División side Albacete. In the club's first pre-season friendly, on 29 June, they drew with Colón at the Estadio Marcelo Bielsa; Francisco Fydriszewski netted their goal. A further match was soon played, which ended in defeat for Newell's. Hours after, the exit of Franco Pérez was confirmed as he moved to Río Cuarto's Estudiantes. 2018–19 loans expired on/around 30 June. 30 June saw Lisandro Cabrera agree a Patriotas loan.

Matías Tissera was loaned to Platense on 1 July. Julián Marcioni was also added to the out on loan list, as the forward penned terms with Independiente Rivadavia. Ramiro Macagno, a goalkeeper, was loaned in from Primera B Nacional's Atlético de Rafaela on 5 July. Luís Leal and youngster Nazareno Funez scored to help Newell's beat Godoy Cruz in friendly games on 6 July. Cristian Lema secured a loan deal from Benfica on 10 July. Newell's went unbeaten in exhibition encounters with Defensa y Justicia on 13 July, coming out victorious in match two after a strike from Mauro Formica. Lucas Albertengo was captured on loan from Independiente on 13 July, while Lisandro Alzugaray and Jalil Elías left temporarily on 14 July for Central Córdoba (SdE) and Unión Santa Fe.

Jalil Elías went on loan to fellow Primera División team Unión Santa Fe on 17 July. Francisco Manenti, just off a loan stint in Peru with Unión Comercio, agreed a further temporary contract with Central Córdoba (SdE) on 17 July. Newell's met Independiente in pre-season friendlies on 17 July, sharing victories at the Estadio Libertadores de América. Newell's were held to draws in matches with Atlético de Rafaela on 20 July. Matías Orihuela, a left-back from Greek club Apollon Smyrnis, became Newell's second permanent incoming, fifth overall, on 22 July. Leonel Ferroni and Nicolás Temperini both sealed loans away later on 22 July, joining Central Córdoba (SdE) and Mitre respectively; making Ferroni the third part-time outgoing to newly-promoted Santiago del Estero outfit Central Córdoba (SdE).

Hernán Bernardello, a recently returning loanee, left permanently for Belgrano on 23 July. Julián Fernández made a return to his homeland on 23 July, as he secured terms from Palestino.

July
Newell's Old Boys met Central Córdoba (SdE) in their first fixture of 2019–20 in the Primera División, defeating them after goals from Alexis Rodríguez and Lucas Albertengo. Rodrigo Salinas was loaned from Vélez Sarsfield on 30 July. Newell's had two friendly encounters with Primera B Nacional's Sarmiento on 31 July, losing the first after a Pablo Magnín brace before winning game two later in the day.

August
Newell's made a seventh new signing on 1 August, as Lucas Villarruel joined from Defensa y Justicia. Their Primera División fixture with Independiente was postponed in early August, after Independiente and CONMEBOL had disagreements regarding the scheduling of a Copa Sudamericana encounter. Newell's won two friendlies over Central Córdoba (R) on 9 August, scoring three goals in the process. Francisco Fydriszewski joined Chile's Deportes Antofagasta on a five-month loan on 13 August. 17 August saw Unión Santa Fe travel to the Estadio Marcelo Bielsa, with Newell's beating them by two goals to nil; matching their result from matchday one. Newell's put four past Argentino in a friendly on 20 August; a game that was set for unused players from the Unión win.

Maximiliano Ribero signed with Torneo Federal A side Sportivo Las Parejas on loan for twelve months on 21 August. On 22 August, youngster Enzo Barrenechea was transferred to Swiss Super League side Sion. Newell's suffered their first dropped points of 2019–20 on 24 August, as Vélez Sarsfield put three past them at the José Amalfitani Stadium. Joaquín Torres headed off on loan to Greek club Volos on 26 August, joining Brian Sarmiento who did similar on 1 July. After prematurely returning from Patriotas, Lisandro Cabrera was loaned out again to Gimnasia y Esgrima (M).

September
Newell's thrashed Huracán 4–1 on 1 September, which maintained their competitive 100% record at home in 2019–20. Newell's confirmed, on 3 September, that youngster Diego González had joined Torneo Federal A's San Martín on loan.

Squad

Transfers
Domestic transfer windows:3 July 2019 to 24 September 201920 January 2020 to 19 February 2020.

Transfers in

Transfers out

Loans in

Loans out

Friendlies

Pre-season
A friendly match with Godoy Cruz was announced for Newell's Old Boys on 15 June 2019. They also had a fixture with Defensa y Justicia scheduled on 27 June, with it to take place on 13 July. Further friendlies with Colón, Atlético de Rafaela and Independiente were set.

Mid-season
Newell's Old Boys agreed to play Sarmiento in friendlies on 31 July. Central Córdoba (R) would play Newell's on 9 August, as would Argentino on 20 August.

Competitions

Primera División

League table

Relegation table

Source: AFA

Results summary

Matches
The fixtures for the 2019–20 campaign were released on 10 July.

Copa Argentina

Copa de la Superliga

Squad statistics

Appearances and goals

Statistics accurate as of 2 September 2019.

Goalscorers

Notes

References

Newell's Old Boys seasons
Newell's Old Boys